The Mansudae Art Theatre is a theatre located near the Grand People's Study House central library, in North Korea. It was completed in 1976.

It is used as a venue for the Samjiyon Band.

See also 
 List of theatres in North Korea
 Mansudae Art Studio

References 

Theatres in North Korea
Theatres completed in 1976
Buildings and structures in Pyongyang
1976 establishments in North Korea
20th-century architecture in North Korea